is a Japanese comedian.

Gorgeous is represented by Sun Music Production. He was formerly signed with Denner Systems.

Filmography

TV programmes

Current programmes

Former programmes

Former appearances

 Neta programmes

 Entertainment shows

Radio programmes

Internet broadcasts

TV dramas

Voice acting

Anime television

Video games

Other TV programmes

Advertisements

Music videos

Videography

Discography

Applications

Bibliography

See also
Iwaki, Fukushima

References

External links
 
 Official Profile (Sun Music HP) 

Japanese comedians
1978 births
Living people
People from Fukushima Prefecture